USS Wandank has been the name of more than one United States Navy ship, and may refer to:

 , originally Fleet Tug No. 26, later ATO-26, a fleet tug in commission from 1920 to 1922 and from 1922 to 1946
 , named USS ATA-204 from 1945 to 1952, an auxiliary ocean-going tug in commission from 1945 to 1947 and from 1952 to 1971.

United States Navy ship names